The 2010 Challenger Banque Nationale de Granby was a professional tennis tournament played on outdoor hard courts. It was the 17th edition of the tournament and part of the 2010 ATP Challenger Tour, offering totals of $50,000 in prize money. It took place in Granby, Quebec, Canada between July 26 and August 1, 2010.

Singles main-draw entrants

Seeds

1 Rankings are as of July 19, 2010

Other entrants
The following players received wildcards into the singles main draw:
 Philip Bester
 Érik Chvojka
 Frank Dancevic
 Steven Diez

The following players received entry from the qualifying draw:
 Richard Bloomfield
 Adam Feeney
 Hiroki Kondo
 Toshihide Matsui

Champions

Singles

 Tobias Kamke def.  Milos Raonic, 6–3, 7–6(7–4)

Doubles

 Frederik Nielsen /  Joseph Sirianni def.  Sanchai Ratiwatana /  Sonchat Ratiwatana, 4–6, 6–4, [10–6]

External links
Official website

Challenger Banque Nationale de Granby
Challenger de Granby
Challenger Banque Nationale de Granby
Challenger Banque Nationale de Granby
Challenger Banque Nationale de Granby